State of Grace may refer to:

Religion
 State (religious life), religious classification of humanity
 State (theology) of being in God's grace in Christian theology

Film and television
 State of Grace (TV series), an American sitcom
 State of Grace (1990 film), a 1990 American crime film directed by Phil Joanou
 State of Grace (1986 film), a 1986 French drama romance film
 States of Grace, a 2005 film directed by Richard Dutcher

Music
 State of Grace (band), a hardcore punk band from Santa Cruz, California
 State of Grace, a 90s ambient electronica/pop band previously known as Fatal Charm

Albums
 State of Grace (album), a 2008 album by the Street Dogs
 State of Grace, a 2000 album by Paul Schwartz
 State of Grace, a 2007 album by The Holmes Brothers

Songs
 "State of Grace" (song), a 2012 song by Taylor Swift
 "State of Grace", by Billy Joel from the album Storm Front, 1989
 "State of Grace", by Nomeansno from the album The Worldhood of the World (As Such), 1995
 "State of Grace", by Patti Scialfa from the album 23rd St. Lullaby, 2004
 "State of Grace", by Talib Kweli from the album Gravitas, 2013
 "State of Grace", a 1996 song by Annie Crummer